Sebastiano Luperto (born 6 September 1996) is an Italian professional footballer who plays as a defender for  club Empoli, on loan from Napoli.

Club career
Luperto is a youth exponent from Napoli. He made his Serie A debut on 3 May 2015 against Milan replacing David López after 84 minutes in a 3–0 home win.

On 5 October 2020, he joined Crotone on loan.

On 13 August 2021, Luperto moved on loan to Empoli. On 18 July 2022, he returned to Empoli on a new loan with an obligation to buy.

International career
On 25 May 2018, Luperto made his debut with the Italy U21 team in a friendly match lost 3–2 against Portugal.

Career statistics

Club

Honours
Empoli
Serie B: 2017–18

Napoli
Coppa Italia: 2019–20

References

Living people
1996 births
Sportspeople from Lecce
Footballers from Apulia
Italian footballers
Italy under-21 international footballers
Italy youth international footballers
Association football defenders
S.S.C. Napoli players
F.C. Pro Vercelli 1892 players
Empoli F.C. players
F.C. Crotone players
Serie A players
Serie B players